fflick was a website devoted to reviews, information, and news of films based on information collected on Twitter the microblogging and social media service. fflick was launched in August 2010 by Kurt Wilms and three other ex Digg employees. It was acquired by Google during January, 2011. After this the service was discontinued.

Similar to how Rotten Tomatoes or Metacritic aggregates movie reviews of new releases, fflick gathers tweets about a particular film in one place. The site categorizes tweets into positive or negative reactions. It also allows you to buy movie tickets, add certain films to your Netflix queue, and retweet other's tweets. You can also check out what certain “influential” users of Twitter think of certain films — a distinction that's made by comparing the number of one's followers versus the number of people they follow.

References

Twitter services and applications
Google acquisitions
Discontinued Google acquisitions
Defunct online companies